The Chassahowitzka River is a spring-fed river located in southwestern Citrus County, Florida. The  river is home to hundreds of species of birds including the bald eagle, and is a common refuge for the West Indian manatee. It is accessible by boat from a nearby public boat ramp that is located at the campground that also bears its Indian name which means "land of hanging pumpkins;" a reference to a wild variety that once grew along the banks.

The headwater of the river is Chassahowitzka Spring, a first magnitude spring which is visible from the campground dock.  A group of smaller sister springs are located in a creek just up from the main vent. Several of these sister springs are connected via underwater caves that snorkelers can dive through while holding their breath. Great care must be taken when diving through these caves, there have been at least 4 drownings in the underwater tunnels and caves since 1989, the most recent being in 2011. Similar freshwater tributaries feed into the Chassahowitzka River further downstream, some of which mix with salt water as the river weaves its way toward the Gulf, creating brackish creeks and bays where it is quite common to catch fish species such as spotted seatrout, redfish, or common snook to name just a few.  Other staples of the river include striped mullet, which can be seen in schools through the clear water or at times leaping out of the water, and the blue crab which is often netted or trapped by local fishermen. It is very common to see several species of herons and egrets, including the great blue heron and the occasional large alligator, although they are often seen some distance from springs and boats.  The river is well known for its navigational hazards, mainly due to large rocks hidden from the sight of fast moving motorboats that venture outside the narrow channel.

There are cabins dotted along the outer portion of the river just before "Buzzard Bay," that are privately owned.  Dog Island is a recreation area with a restroom and dock located off the main channel just before John's Island and the Gulf.

Gallery

References

Rivers of Florida
National Wildlife Refuges in Florida
Bodies of water of Citrus County, Florida
Outstanding Florida Waters